The Huaihai campaign, or Battle of Hsupeng, was one of the military conflicts in the late stage of the Chinese Civil War between the Kuomintang and the Chinese Communist Party. The campaign started when the People's Liberation Army (PLA) launched a major offensive against the Kuomintang headquarters in Xuzhou on 6 November 1948, and ended on 10 January 1949 when the PLA reached the north of the Yangtze.

Background 
After the fall of Jinan to the Communists on 24 September 1948, the PLA began planning for a larger campaign to engage the remaining Nationalist forces in the Shandong province and their main force in Xuzhou. In face of the rapidly deteriorating military situation in the Northeast, the Nationalist government decided to deploy on both sides of the Tianjin–Pukou Railway to prevent the PLA from advancing south toward the Yangtze River.

PLA strategy 
Su Yu, the acting commander of the Eastern China Field Army proposed an operational plan to the Communist war council. The plan was to encircle the Nationalist Sixth and Seventh Army, which were still stationed in the Shandong province. The council quickly approved this plan and ordered the Central Plains Field Army under Liu Bocheng, Chen Yi (Commander of the Eastern China Field Army and liaison to the Central Plains Field Army) and Deng Xiaoping (Political Commissar of the Central Plains Field Army) to assault the Nationalist garrison in Henan and Anhui to breakthrough to Shandong.

Campaign

Encirclement of Xuzhou (6–22 November 1948) 
As the Nationalist Sixth and Seventh Army began retreating to Xuzhou by crossing the grand canal, they were behind their original schedule. Lieutenant General Huang Baitao of the Seventh Army had to wait for three days before troops from the Ninth Pacification Zone arrived, and consequently several bridgeheads were unsecured prior to the crossing. On 8 November, 23,000 Nationalist troops defected to the Communist side, exposing the retreat route of the Seventh Army back to Xuzhou. 70,000 men of the PLA marched on and surrounded the main forces of the Seventh Army east of Xuzhou, and intercepted the remaining Nationalist forces as they were crossing the river. Du Yuming, the commander of the Nationalist garrison in Xuzhou, decided to attack the Central Plains Field Army and capture the key railway checkpoints to break the siege on the Seventh Army. However, Chiang Kai-shek and Liu Zhi overruled his plan as being too risky and ordered the Xuzhou Garrison to rescue the 7th army directly. The communists anticipated this move from good intelligence and correct reasoning, deployed more than half of the Eastern China Field Army to blocking the relief effort. More importantly, Lieutenant General Qiu Qingquan, commander of the 2nd Army, had a personal feud with Huang Baitao and mistrusted the faulty intelligence he had been given in previous battles, and did not commit his elite American-trained 5th corps into battle. The 13th Army commanded by Lieutenant General Li Mi did try but was blocked by the communists. The 7th army managed to hold out for 16 days without supplies and reinforcement and inflicted 49,000 casualties on the PLA forces before being destroyed. Huang Baitao committed suicide in his headquarters on November 22, 1948.

Shuangduiji campaign (23 November – 15 December 1948) 

With the Seventh Army no longer in existence, the east flank of Xuzhou were completely exposed to Communist attack. The Communist sympathizer in the Nationalist government managed to persuade Chiang to move the Nationalist headquarters to the south. In the meanwhile, the Communist Central Plains Field Army intercepted the Nationalist Twelfth Army led by Huang Wei coming from Henan as an reinforcement. General Liu Ruming's Eighth Army and Lieutenant General Li Yannian's Sixth Army tried to break the Communist siege but to no avail. The Twelfth Army also ceased to exist after nearly a month of bloody conflicts, with many newly taken Nationalist prisoners of war joining the Communist forces instead. Only Huang's deputy commander, Lieutenant General Hu Lien, riding in an armored tank, managed to penetrate the communist encirclement with 8,000 survivors, but was badly wounded in the breakout. Chiang Kai-shek tried to save the 12th army and ordered the three armies still under the Suppression General Headquarters of Xuzhou Garrison to turn southeast and relieve the 12th army before it was too late on November 30, 1948.  However, the PLA forces caught up with them and they were encircled only 9 miles from Xuzhou.

Fall of Xuzhou (23 December 1948 – 10 January 1949) 
On December 15, the day which the 12th army was wiped out, the 16th army under General Sun Yuanliang broke out from the communist encirclement on its own. Although Sun himself made it safely back to Nanjing, most of his officers and soldiers were killed or captured in the process. Du Yuming decided to hold out as Chiang had ordered. As one of the ablest strategists in the ROC army, Du Yuming came up with three different options for the current hopeless situation: first, recall the ROC troops in Xi'an and Wuhan to battle the communists; second, to wait for reinforcements; and the third was to break out on their own. He was disappointed when Chiang chose the riskiest one: order them to break out. There was more than a month of heavy snowfalls, which made the ROC air forces unable to provide air support to the besieged ground units. As food and ammunition diminished, many ROC soldiers killed their horses to feed themselves and communist forces used food to entice the ROC forces to surrender; about 10,000 did so. On January 6, 1949, communist forces launched a general offensive on the 13th army and remnants of the 13th army withdrew to 2nd army's defense area. Four days later, communist forces captured General Du Yuming; General Qiu Qinquan shot himself while trying to break out with his troops; only General Li Mi was able to escape back to Nanjing. The 6th and 8th armies of ROC retreated to the south of Huai river, and the campaign was over.

Aftermath 

The heavy losses suffered by Whampoa-trained troops under the direct command of Chiang significantly weakened the position of Chiang in the Nationalist government. With pressure from former political rivals such as Li Zongren and Bai Chongxi, Chiang announced his temporary retirement. As the PLA approached the Yangtze, the momentum shifted completely toward the Communist side. Without effective measures against PLA advance across the Yangtze, the Nationalist government in Nanjing began losing their support from the United States, as American military aid gradually came to a stop.

Films 
In the 1980s, the CCP made three epic war movies called the Three Great Campaigns to commemorate their victories and propagate the view that they created a new China based on communism. The 2007 film Assembly was also based on the Huaihai campaign. More recently the Shanghai Film Studio (上海电影制片厂)  made the 2009 film, The Founding of a Republic to commemorate the 60th year of the CCP; there was a scene dedicated to this campaign, also Assembly was initially set on this part of campaign, which the protagonist's group was sacrificed to save the whole regiment.

References

Citations

Sources 

 
 

 
 

Conflicts in 1948
Conflicts in 1949
Campaigns of the Chinese Civil War
1948 in China
1949 in China
Military history of Shandong
Military history of Jiangsu